State Road 686 (SR 686) is an east–west route in Pinellas County, running from U.S. Route 19 Alternate (Alt. US 19) in Largo east to an intersection with SR 687 (4th Street) and SR 694 (Gandy Boulevard) in St. Petersburg, Florida. Originally, SR 686 extended further west, ending at Gulf Boulevard in Belleair Beach, next to the shores of the Gulf of Mexico.

Route description
State Road 686 begins at Alt US 19, running east as East Bay Drive.  It runs through Largo, where it crosses an interchange with US 19 and east of the intersection, SR 686 is known as Roosevelt Boulevard, named for President Franklin Delano Roosevelt.  It then travels in a southeastern direction through Clearwater, and intersects SR 688 (Ulmerton Road), and heads east with a concurrency for just under a mile.  At the end of the concurrency, SR 686 once again heads southeast, entering St. Petersburg.  An interchange with Interstate 275 (I-275) follows, and SR 686 ends at the intersection with SR 687 (4th Street) and SR 694 (Gandy Boulevard).

Major intersections

State Road 686A
State Road 686A (SR 686A) is an under-construction state road in St. Petersburg. The route is being constructed along what is currently Pinellas County Road 296, consisting of 118th Avenue North and the 118th Avenue Connector, as part of the Gateway Expressway.

The route currently runs from the foot of the 118th Avenue Connector westbound offramp (milepost 1.582) to just east of the I-275 on-ramps (milepost 3.021).

County Road 416

County Road 416 extends from Gulf Boulevard in Belleair Beach, east to Clearwater-Largo Road in Largo.  The entirety of the route was previously signed as SR 686. From Gulf Boulevard in Belleair Beach, through Belleair Bluffs to Indian Rocks Road, the road is called the Belleair Causeway. In Largo, it becomes West Bay Drive. West Bay Drive is historically Largo's "Main Street".

References

Further reading
 Largo Area Historical Society. From Pines and Palmettos—A portrait of Largo. The Donning Company Publishers. Virginia Beach, Va. 2005.
 Largo Bicentennial Book Committee. Largo, then till . . . . Largo Area Historical Society. 1979.
 Pinellas County Staff. Pinellas County GIS Viewer.  Online May 6, 2006.

External links

686
686